East Jordan, Nova Scotia  is a community of the Municipality of the District of Shelburne in the Canadian province of Nova Scotia on Nova Scotia Trunk 3.

References
East Jordan on Destination Nova Scotia

Communities in Shelburne County, Nova Scotia
General Service Areas in Nova Scotia